Back to Then is the first studio album by the American singer Darius Rucker, lead singer of Hootie & the Blowfish. 

The song "This Is My World" was used in the soundtrack for the film, Shallow Hal.

Track listing
"Wild One" (Vidal Davis, Andre Harris, Ryan Toby) – 3:38
"Exodus" (Carvin Haggins, Darren Henson, Keith Pelzer) – 4:11
"Sometimes I Wonder" (featuring Jill Scott) (Davis, Aja Graydon, Harris, Darius Rucker, Jill Scott) – 4:14
"Back to Then" (Harris, Kipper Jones, Rucker, Derek Washington) – 4:58
"This Is My World" (Henson, Pelzer, Rucker, Kenna Zemedkun) – 5:05
"I'm Glad You're Mine" (Al Green) – 3:05
"Butterfly" (Peter Black) – 4:31
"Hold On" (Jimmy Cozier, Justin Cozier, S. Phillips, Rucker) – 4:06
"Ten Years" (Edward Ferrell, Darren Lighty, Cynthia Loving, Rucker) – 3:56
"One More Night" (Jazz Nixon, Rucker) – 4:17
"Amazing Grace" (Interlude) (John Newton) – 0:48
"Somewhere" (Daniel Johnson, Nixon, Rucker) – 3:41
"Sleeping in My Bed" (featuring Snoop Dogg) (Darrell Allamby, Calvin Broadus, Kenneth Dickerson, Antoinette Roberson, Rucker) – 4:43

Personnel
Credits adapted from album's liner notes.

 Darrell "Delite" Allamby – backing vocals (track 13)
 Arden Altino – co-producer (track 8)
 Davis Barnett – viola (track 5)
 Rob Chiarelli – mixing (tracks 1-5)
 Chris Conway – engineer (track 8)
 Jimmy Cozier – producer, vocal arrangements, and backing vocals (track 8)
 Mike Davis – trombone (track 10)
 Vidal Davis – producer (tracks 1, 3, 4), engineer and drums (track 3)
 Ivan Dupée – producer, engineer, mixing, programming, bass guitar, clavinet, drum programming, Fender Rhodes, organ, synthesizer, and vocal arrangements (track 13)
 Ethan Farmer – bass guitar (track 12)
 Edward "DJ Eddie F" Ferrell – producer, arrangements, drum programming, and instrumentation (track 9)
 Erik Ferrell – assistant engineer (track 9)
 Brian Garten – engineer (track 6)
 Serban Ghenea – engineer (tracks 1, 2, 4)
 Ask Giz – engineer (track 9)
 Larry Gold – strings (track 3), cello (track 5)
 Vivian Green – backing vocals (track 4)
 Carvin Haggins – producer and backing vocals (track 2)
 Woody Harrelson – backing vocals (track 8)
 Andre Harris – producer (tracks 1, 3, 4), engineer and keyboards (track 3)
 Keith Henderson – guitar (track 13)
 Darren Henson – producer (tracks 2, 5)
 Shawn Hibbler – drum fills and hi-hats (track 13)
 Travis House – producer (tracks 6, 7), engineer and mixing (track 7)
 Jim Hynes – trumpet (track 10)
 Gwen Jackson – backing vocals (track 2)
 Jeeve – producer (tracks 6, 7), engineer and mixing (track 7)
 Daniel Johnson – backing vocals (tracks 10, 12)
 Kipper Jones – backing vocals (track 4)
 Jeff Kievit – trumpet (track 10)
 Olga Konopelsky – violin (track 5)
 Emma Kummrow – violin (track 5)
 Darren Lighty – producer, arrangements, drum programming, and instrumentation (track 9)
 David Lopez – engineer (tracks 10, 12)
 Lil' Mo – backing vocals (track 9)
 Joe Mardin – horn arrangements (track 10)
 Darius “D-Rain" McGuire – backing vocals (track 8)
 Musiq – backing vocals (track 2)
 Jazz Nixon – producer (tracks 10, 12)
 Richard Patterson – bass fills (track 13)
 Keith Pelzer – producer (tracks 2, 5), engineer and Fender Rhodes (track 5)
 Kevin Perry – assistant engineer (track 9)
 Gus Rickette – drum programming (track 13)
 Paul Riezer – violin (track 5)
 Antoinette Roberson – backing vocals (track 13)
 Eric Roberson – backing vocals (tracks 1, 4, 13)
 Jacob Robinson – engineer and mixing (track 13)
 Darius Rucker – lead vocals (all tracks), vocal arrangements and backing vocals (tracks 8, 13) 
 Erik Sayles – acoustic guitar (tracks 2, 4)
 Jill Scott – lead vocals and vocal arrangements (track 3)
 Andy Snitzer – saxophone (track 10)
 Snoop Dogg – additional vocals (track 13)
 Greg Tepperman – violin (track 5)
 Ryan Toby – vocal arrangements and backing vocals (track 1)
 Terry Tribbett – bass guitar (tracks 3, 5)
 Sid Vee – co-producer (track 8)
 Dave Way – mixing (tracks 6, 8-10, 12)
 Jimmy "June Bug" White – engineer (track 3)
 Josh Wilbur – engineer (track 10)
 Byron Williams – organ (tracks 10, 12)
 Jay Williams – guitar (track 12)
 Rick Williams – guitar and bass guitar (track 10)
 Kenna Zemedkun – backing vocals (track 2)

Chart performance

References

2002 debut albums
Darius Rucker albums
Hidden Beach Recordings albums
Contemporary R&B albums by American artists
Neo soul albums
Soul albums by American artists